Passiflora zamorana is a species of plant in the family Passifloraceae. It is endemic to Ecuador.

References

Endemic flora of Ecuador
zamorana
Endangered plants
Taxonomy articles created by Polbot